Adriana María Sachs (born 25 December 1993) is an Argentine footballer who plays as a centre back for Brazilian club Santos and the Argentina women's national team.

Club career
After playing for Huracán and UAI Urquiza in her home country, Sachs moved to Spanish Segunda División Pro side UD Collerense in July 2020. After playing in just two matches, she returned to Argentina in the following year, with Boca Juniors.

On 15 January 2023, after being a regular starter in Boca's 2022 Copa Liberadores Femenina runner-up campaign, Sachs was announced at Brazilian club Santos.

International career
Sachs represented Argentina at the 2012 FIFA U-20 Women's World Cup. She made her senior debut on 16 March 2014. That day, Argentina won the gold medal at the South American Games. She later played for the country at two Copa América Femenina editions (2014 and 2018) and the Pan American Games in 2015 and 2019.

References

External links 
Adriana Sachs at BDFutbol
Adriana María Sachs at the 2019 Pan American Games

1993 births
Living people
People from Morón Partido
Sportspeople from Buenos Aires Province
Argentine women's footballers
Women's association football fullbacks
Huracán (women) players
UAI Urquiza (women) players
UD Collerense (women) players
Boca Juniors (women) footballers
Santos FC (women) players
Segunda Federación (women) players
Argentina women's youth international footballers
Argentina women's international footballers
2019 FIFA Women's World Cup players
Footballers at the 2015 Pan American Games
Pan American Games competitors for Argentina
Footballers at the 2019 Pan American Games
Medalists at the 2019 Pan American Games
Pan American Games medalists in football
Pan American Games silver medalists for Argentina
Competitors at the 2014 South American Games
South American Games medalists in football
South American Games gold medalists for Argentina
Argentine expatriate women's footballers
Argentine expatriate sportspeople in Spain
Argentine expatriate sportspeople in Brazil
Expatriate women's footballers in Spain
Expatriate women's footballers in Brazil